Goikarla Rigyu, also spelled Goikarla Ri'gyü or Guotalari, is a range of mountains to the north of the Yarlung Tsangpo River and southeast of the city of Lhasa in the Tibet Autonomous Region of China.

Location

The Goikarla Rigyu extends along the north bank of the Yarlung Tsangpo from Gonggar to Mainling. 
To the north of the range, the lower reaches of the Lhasa River run westward and then turn south to join the Yarlung Tsangpo. 
Further east, the Nyang River rises in the range to the west of Mila Mountain and runs east and then south past Nyingchi to join the Yarlung Tsangpo just downstream from Mainling.
The range includes the "WordeKongge" holy mountain.

References

Citations

Sources 
 Works cited

 
 

Mountain ranges of Tibet
Geography of Lhasa